Three ships of the Peruvian Navy have been named BAP Aguirre after Peruvian Commander Elías Aguirre:

 , commissioned in 1951, was a 
 , commissioned in 1978, was a 
 , commissioned in 2005, is a 

Peruvian Navy ship names